Firefrost Arcanum is the first full-length album released by the Polish symphonic black metal band Vesania. It was recorded, remixed and mastered at different times between the Winter of 2001 and the Summer of 2002 at Selani Studio in Olsztyn, Poland. It was released in 2003 through Crash Music and Empire Records.

Track listing 
 "Path 1. Mystherion. Crystaleyes" – 5:31
 "Path 2. Introit Algor" – 0:35
 "Path 3. Nova Persei" – 8:46
 "Path 4. Algorfocus Nefas" – 2:42
 "Path 5. Marduke's Mazemerising" – 4:39
 "Path 6. Moonthrone. Dawn Broken" – 9:38
 "Path 7. Introit Focus" – 0:39
 "Path 8. Daemoonion Act II" – 8:45
 "Path 9. Introit Nefas" – 0:40
 "Path 10. Dukedoom Black" – 9:39

Notes 
 Note that Path 2. Introit Algor, Path 4. Algorfocus Nefas, Path 7. Introit Focus and Path 9: Introit Nefas are all interlude tracks, and thus contain no lyrics.

Personnel 
 Tomasz "Orion" Wróblewski – guitars, vocals
 Dariusz "Daray" Brzozowski – drums and percussion
 Filip "Heinrich" Hałucha – bass guitar
 Krzysztof "Siegmar" Oloś – keyboard
 Filip "Annahvahr" Żołyński – guitars
 Szymon "Szymonaz" Czech – co–producer
 Krzysztof "Sado" Sadowski – photography

References

External links 
Official website
Lyrics at the official website
Encyclopaedia Metallum

2003 albums
Vesania albums